Cocceupodidae is a family of mites in the  order Trombidiformes. There are at least 3 genera and about 23 described species in Cocceupodidae.

Genera
These three genera belong to the family Cocceupodidae:
 Cocceupodes (Thor, 1934)
 Filieupodes Jesionowska, 2010
 Linopodes (C.L.Koch, 1835)

References

Further reading

External links

 

Trombidiformes
Acari families